The following is a list of ECHL arenas including past and present arenas:

Eastern Conference

Western Conference

Future teams

Defunct teams

Notes 

ECHL
Lists of indoor arenas
Lists of sports venues in the United States